The St. Elmo hotel constructed in 1898 is located on Main Street in the town of Ouray, Colorado.  This structure has been placed on the United States National Register of Historic Places.

The interior of the hotel has been restored as a Victorian era hotel, much the way it was when it opened to miners in the late 19th century.

References

External links
Ouray Historical Society

Hotels in Colorado
Buildings and structures in Ouray County, Colorado
Historic district contributing properties in Colorado
National Register of Historic Places in Ouray County, Colorado
Hotel buildings on the National Register of Historic Places in Colorado